Carolyn Glover Utz (1913 – March 9, 2005) was an American musician, conductor and educator. She was a bass player for the Columbus Symphony Orchestra for 30 years and was the first black member of the orchestra's predecessor, the Columbus Philharmonic Orchestra.

Biography 
Utz grew up in Columbus, Ohio, and earned both her bachelor's and master's degrees from Ohio State University (OSU). She taught at several colleges after graduating from OSU, including at North Carolina State College, Kentucky State College, and Edward Waters College.

In 1944, Utz was a candidate for the Columbus Philharmonic Orchestra. She auditioned with Izler Solomon, who was looking to hire black musicians. Utz, on bass, became the first African-American member of the orchestra and was, at the time, the only black person working for an orchestra of its size in the country. Utz performed with the orchestra, which later became the Columbus Symphony Orchestra for 30 years. From 1974 to 1991, she was the conductor of the Top Teens Orchestra.

Utz was a member of Alpha Kappa Alpha. She was inducted into the Chillicothe chapter of the Top Ladies of Distinction in 1984. In 1988, she was inducted into the Ohio Women's Hall of Fame. She was inducted into the Senior Musicians Hall of Fame in 1996.

Utz died on March 9, 2005, at the age of 91.

References

External links 
Columbus Black Women and Their Contributions Calendar (1987)
Photograph (1951)

1913 births
2005 deaths
American double-bassists
American conductors (music)
People from Columbus, Ohio
Ohio State University alumni
African-American musicians
North Carolina State University faculty
Kentucky State University faculty
Edward Waters College faculty
20th-century African-American women
20th-century African-American people
20th-century American people
American women academics
21st-century African-American people
21st-century African-American women